The papal conclave of 2013 was convened to elect a pope, the leader of the Catholic Church, to succeed Benedict XVI following his resignation on 28 February 2013. In accordance with the apostolic constitution Universi Dominici gregis, which governed the vacancy of the Holy See, only cardinals who had not passed their 80th birthday on the day on which the Holy See became vacant (in this case, those who were born on or after 28 February 1933) were eligible to participate in the conclave. Although not a formal requirement, the cardinal electors invariably elect the pope from among their number. The election was carried out by secret ballot.

Of the 207 members of the College of Cardinals at the time of Benedict XVI's resignation, there were 117 cardinal electors who were eligible to participate in the subsequent conclave. Two cardinal electors did not participate, decreasing the number in attendance to 115.

Of the 115 attending cardinal electors, 4 were cardinal bishops, 81 were cardinal priests, and 30 were cardinal deacons; 48 had been created cardinals by Pope John Paul II and 67 by Pope Benedict XVI; 29 worked in the service of the Holy See (such as in the Roman Curia), 61 were in pastoral ministry outside Rome, and 25 had retired. Another 90 cardinals were ineligible to participate in the conclave, for reasons of age.

The cardinal electors entered the Sistine Chapel to begin the conclave on 12 March 2013. On 13 March, after five ballots over two days, they elected Cardinal Jorge Mario Bergoglio, Archbishop of Buenos Aires, who took the papal name Francis.

Cardinal electors 
The College of Cardinals is divided into three orders: cardinal bishops (CB), cardinal priests (CP) and cardinal deacons (CD), with precedence in that sequence. This is the order in which the cardinal electors process into the conclave, take the oath and cast their ballots. For cardinal bishops, except the Eastern Catholic patriarchs, the dean is first in precedence, followed by the vice-dean and then by the rest in order of appointment as cardinal bishops. For cardinal bishops who are Eastern Catholic patriarchs, for cardinal priests and for cardinal deacons, precedence is determined by the date of the consistory in which they were created cardinals and then by the order in which they appeared in the official announcement or bulletin.

Four of the cardinal electors were from the Eastern Catholic Churches: Antonios Naguib (Coptic), Béchara Boutros Raï (Maronite), George Alencherry (Syro-Malabar) and Baselios Cleemis Thottunkal (Syro-Malankara). Raï and Thottunkal were the first cardinals from their respective churches to participate in a conclave. The senior cardinal bishop, the senior cardinal priest, the senior cardinal deacon and the junior cardinal deacon, who were assigned specific roles in the conclave, such as presiding over the conclave itself (the senior cardinal bishop) or announcing the election of the pope (the senior cardinal deacon), were, respectively, Giovanni Battista Re, Godfried Danneels, Jean-Louis Tauran and James Michael Harvey. The camerlengo of the Holy Roman Church, who was in charge of administering the Holy See during its vacancy, was Tarcisio Bertone.

The data below are as of 28 February 2013, the date on which the Holy See became vacant. All cardinals are of the Latin Church unless otherwise stated. Cardinals belonging to institutes of consecrated life or to societies of apostolic life are indicated by the relevant post-nominal letters.

Not in attendance

Cardinal electors by continent and by country 
The 115 attending cardinal electors were from 48 countries on all six inhabited continents. The countries with the greatest number of cardinal electors were Italy (twenty-eight), the United States (eleven) and Germany (six).

See also 
 Cardinals created by John Paul II
 Cardinals created by Benedict XVI
 Cardinal electors in the 2005 papal conclave

 List of current cardinals

Notes

References 

2013 papal conclave
2013
Pope Benedict XVI
Pope Francis